Eupherusa is a genus of hummingbirds in the family Trochilidae. 
It contains the following five species:

The Mexican woodnymph was formerly placed in the genus Thalurania with other species with "woodnymph" in their English names. A molecular phylogenetic study published in 2014 found that Thalurania was non-monophyletic and that the Mexican woodnymph is closely related to species in Eupherusa. Based on this result the Mexican woodnymph is now placed in Eupherusa.

References

 
Taxonomy articles created by Polbot